Sylvia Ann Ibbetson  (née Butterfield; 8 November 1939 – 25 September 2017), known professionally as Elizabeth Dawn or Liz Dawn, was an English actress, best known for her role as Vera Duckworth in the long-running British soap opera Coronation Street. First starting on the serial in 1974, she had a recurring role as a factory worker until her husband, Jack, (played by Bill Tarmey) first appeared in 1979. She played the character of Vera for 34 years. For her role in the soap, she received the Lifetime Achievement Award at the 2008 British Soap Awards. She was appointed an MBE in the 2000 Queens Birthday Honours.

Career
Dawn was born in Leeds, West Riding of Yorkshire, to parents Albert and Annie Butterfield. She grew up on the city's Halton Moor estate and began her performing career as a nightclub singer. By the late 1960s, Dawn had ventured into acting, often taking small parts in television programmes as well as advertisements. One commercial for Cadbury's biscuits proved popular and helped her gain notice. During the 1970s, she appeared in supporting roles in programmes including All Creatures Great and Small and Colin Welland's television play Leeds United (1974) and several other episodes of the Play for Today series in the mid-1970s.

Dawn first appeared in Coronation Street in 1974. She had a recurring role as a factory worker until her husband, Jack, (played by Bill Tarmey) first appeared in 1979.

She was the subject of a This is Your Life programme in 1990, when she was surprised by Michael Aspel on the set of Coronation Street.

Following a diagnosis of emphysema in March 2004, on 22 July 2007, Granada Television (makers of Coronation Street) announced that Vera Duckworth was to be written out, at Dawn's request, before Christmas, because of further complications with the condition.

Dawn's final appearance came in the episode screened on 18 January 2008, when Vera Duckworth died in her sleep, thus ending 34 years of the character's appearances in the series. Bill Tarmey, who played on screen husband Jack Duckworth, continued to be a part of the cast of Coronation Street and Dawn stated that the hardest thing about leaving Corrie was saying good-bye to Tarmey, with whom she was best friends. On 8 November 2010, she made a brief one-off return to the soap for the final scenes of her on-screen husband, Jack, who died in the same chair as Vera. Dawn appeared as Vera's spirit, who had come to take Jack on his final journey and the pair enjoyed one final dance together.

She came out of retirement in December 2015 to make a one-off guest appearance in the soap Emmerdale as the character Mrs Winterbottom.

Dawn won the Special Achievement Award at the 2008 British Soap Awards for her decades-long portrayal of her iconic character.

Dawn was appointed an MBE in the 2000 Queens Birthday Honours, for services to the Manchester Children's Hospital, the Genesis Appeal and the Liz Dawn Breast Cancer Appeal, St. James's Hospital, Leeds.

Personal life and death
At the age of 18, Dawn married Walter Bradley in Leeds in 1957 and the couple had a son, Graham, but the marriage collapsed when she turned 21. She married electrician Donald Ibbetson in 1965, with whom she had three daughters, Dawn, Ann and Julie. At the time of her death, she had six grandchildren and three great-grandchildren.

In March 2004, Dawn was diagnosed with emphysema (chronic obstructive pulmonary disease – COPD). She attributed the illness to her own smoking habit and performing in smoke-filled clubs. In May 2009, Dawn agreed to become the "Celebrity Ambassador" of the British Lung Foundation (BLF). She also worked to raise awareness of COPD. In June 2009 she spearheaded the campaign "Breathe Easy Week", to raise awareness of the work of the BLF.

In 2013 she revealed her health had deteriorated further after she had a heart attack, and only a third of her lungs were still working. In September 2017 Dawn was admitted to hospital in Manchester with severe breathing problems. Dawn, who had stopped smoking in 2002, had previously said her emphysema had taken such a toll on her that she had nearly collapsed during her appointment as an MBE at Buckingham Palace in 2000.

Dawn died on 25 September 2017, at her home in Whitefield, Greater Manchester, after a long battle with COPD. Tributes came from many Coronation Street actors, celebrity fans, and the Labour MP Tracy Brabin, a former Coronation Street actress, who told BBC News, "She was a legend and an icon, an incredible person to work with. Deeply authentic, a natural comedian and a heart as big as Manchester." Her funeral took place at Salford Cathedral on 6 October 2017.

Filmography

References

External links

Profile of Elizabeth Dawn at corrie.net

1939 births
2017 deaths
20th-century English actresses
21st-century English actresses
Actresses from Leeds
English soap opera actresses
English television actresses
Members of the Order of the British Empire
Nightclub performers
People from Halton Moor
Respiratory disease deaths in England
Deaths from emphysema
Deaths from chronic obstructive pulmonary disease